The River Rea (pronounced "ray") is a small river which passes through Birmingham, England. It is the river on which Birmingham was founded by the Beorma tribe in the 7th century.

Name
The name of the Rea derives from a root found in many Indo-European languages and means "to run" or "to flow".

Course
The Rea rises in Waseley Hills Country Park, with the source well signposted from the car park there. The river's tributaries include Callow Brook, the Bourne (which begins as Merritts Brook before joining Griffins Brook) and Bourne Brook. From Rubery, the river flows into Birmingham near the former Rover works at Longbridge, then flows through a tunnel under the A38. In Northfield, one of the river's few remaining fords is at The Mill Walk, near Hawkesley Mill Lane. After this, the river valley is also used by the railway to Kings Norton.

Wychall Reservoir, near the river at Kings Norton, was  built in the early 19th century by the Worcester Canal Company after mill owners claimed that water was being taken from the river to fill the canal and reducing the working effectiveness of their mills. Following Kings Norton, the river flows through Stirchley. It is now culverted for much of its course through Birmingham, during which it passes through the Pebble Mill area and Cannon Hill Park then Calthorpe Park. A pair of decorative arches on the bridge where Gooch Street crosses the river mark the first settlement of Birmingham. The medieval hamlet of Birmingham was built on a crossing on the Rea in what is now Digbeth. Many of the street names in the area refer to the river or its mills. These include Rea Street, Floodgate Street, River Street and Duddeston Mill Road. There are proposals to include a riverside walk and new bridge over the Rea at Digbeth's Custard Factory media and arts complex (now complete). There are also proposals for the river to be uncovered at the Warwick Bar area of Digbeth.

Flood prevention measures 

The Rea frequently bursts its banks after heavy rain. A £2.7 million scheme to reduce the risk of flooding to homes and businesses in the south of Selly Park was completed in January 2018.

See also 
 Rivers of the United Kingdom

References

Further reading

External links 

 Photo of the Rea at Fazeley St., Birmingham
 Map of the River Rea, Street Map.

Rivers of Warwickshire
Rivers of the West Midlands (county)
1Rea